KIND-FM (94.9 FM) is a radio station licensed to serve the community of Elk City, Kansas. The station is owned by My Town Media, Inc, and airs a hot adult contemporary format.

The station was assigned the call sign KBIK by the Federal Communications Commission on May 19, 2010. The station changed its call sign to KBIP on June 17, 2010, and then to KIND-FM on July 1, 2010.

References

External links
Official Website
FCC Public Inspection File for KIND-FM

IND-FM
Radio stations established in 2010
2010 establishments in Kansas
Hot adult contemporary radio stations in the United States
Montgomery County, Kansas